The Sir Ernest Lee-Steere Classic is a Perth Racing Listed Thoroughbred horse race for three-year-olds at set weights held over 1400 metres, held at Ascot Racecourse in Perth, Western Australia each year in December.  Prize money is A$100,000.

History
The race is named after Ernest Henry Lee-Steere, chairman of the Western Australian Turf Club 1963–1984.

In 2005 and prior to 2000 the race was scheduled during the Perth Cup Carnival.

In 2003 the race was run at Belmont Park Racecourse.

The race was downgraded to a Listed Race in 2016.

Grade
1983–1985 - Listed race
1986–2015 - Group 3
2016 - Listed race

Winners

2019 - Sanabreanna
2018 - The Velvet King
2017 - War Room
2016 - Lusaha
2015 - Lite'n In My Veins
2014 - Liberty's Gem
2013 - Petrol Power
2012 - Hard Ball Get
2011 - Night War
2010 - Playcidium Mint
2009 - Dino Mak
2008 - Destino
2007 - Yuro
2006 - Mansion House
2005 (Dec.) - Stormy Nova
2005 (Jan.) - Secret Monarch
2003 - Changing Lanes
2002 - Early Express
2001 - Dexian
2000 - Master Park
1999 - Zedamoss
1999 - Fly My Kite
1998 - Wolf Pack
1997 - The Medic
1995 - Ned's Brother
1994 (Dec.) - Discussion
1994 (Jan.) - Mobile Link
1993 - Classy Dresser
1992 - Mount Angelo
1991 - Paklani
1990 - Stray Bullet
1989 - Lady Of Battle
1988 - Edge Of Darkness
1987 - Placid Ark
1986 - Fimiston
1985 - Renminbi
1984 - Top Post
1983 - Corona Miss

See also

 List of Australian Group races
 Group races

References

Horse races in Australia
Flat horse races for three-year-olds
Sport in Perth, Western Australia